The Dominion Observatory was an astronomical observatory  in Ottawa, Ontario that operated from 1902 to 1970. The Observatory was also an institution within the Canadian Federal Government.  The observatory grew out of the Department of the Interior's need for the precise coordinates and timekeeping that at that time could only come from an observatory. For several years they had used a small observatory on the Ottawa River for this purpose. In 1902, it was decided that Canada needed a larger national observatory similar to the Royal Greenwich Observatory in Britain.

Chief Dominion Architect David Ewart designed the Dominion Observatory in 1902.

The new building was then erected near Dow's Lake on the Agriculture Department's Central Experimental Farm land. This Romanesque Revival building was completed in 1905. Its main instrument was a 15-inch refracting telescope, the largest refracting telescope ever installed in Canada, although it was not a particularly large telescope for this period. While the building and institution were primarily dedicated to astronomical timekeeping in support of surveying, a number of other activities took place here. The Dominion Observatory was Canada's leading institution in Geophysics for many decades, which included the operation of Canada's national seismometer network. The facility did important work, but with this bridgehead into the world of astronomy and the growth of the field of astrophysics, Canadian astronomers quickly demanded a facility designed for the new scientific age. In 1917, the Dominion Astrophysical Observatory was opened in Victoria, B.C. and it supplanted the Dominion Observatory as Canada's foremost astronomical observatory. For many years, the Dominion Observatory was best known to Canadians as the source of Canada's official time signal.

The observatory continued in operation until 1970 at which time Canada's science institutions were reorganized. The national time-keeping and astronomical activities were transferred to the National Research Council of Canada, while the geophysics, surveying and mapping were transferred to the Department of Energy Mines and Resources. The Geophysics work was later merged into the Geological Survey of Canada, now part of Natural Resources Canada. Astronomical timekeeping observations at the Dominion Observatory had ceased many years prior to this, when crystal oscillator clocks and, later, atomic clocks were found to be superior to astronomical timekeeping.  The building became home to NRCan offices. The telescope had been open for public viewing from 1905 until 1970.  In 1974, the telescope was moved from the Dominion Observatory to the Helen Sawyer Hogg Observatory at the Canada Science and Technology Museum where it remained until 2016.

As of 2008, the building is the home to the Office of Energy Efficiency, a part of the Energy Branch, Natural Resources Canada.

See also
List of largest optical refracting telescopes
Dominion Astrophysical Observatory (Home to 2nd largest telescope in the world in the 1910s on debut)
David Dunlap Observatory (Home to 2nd largest telescope in the world in 1930s on debut)

References

External links

 https://web.archive.org/web/20070701185832/http://www.sciencetech.technomuses.ca/english/collection/dominion_observatory.cfm
The Dominion Observatory – 100th Anniversary
 

Astronomical observatories in Canada
Federal government buildings in Ottawa
Buildings and structures completed in 1905
Romanesque Revival architecture in Canada
Geological Survey of Canada
1905 establishments in Ontario